The Wildwoods Shore Resort Historic District, or Doo Wop Motel District, is an area in The Wildwoods, New Jersey, that was home to over 300 motels built during the Doo-Wop era of the 1950s and 1960s. Officially recognized as a historic district by the State of New Jersey, it lies primarily in the municipality of Wildwood Crest, along a two-mile stretch between Atlantic and Ocean avenues, and includes areas in Wildwood and North Wildwood. The term doo-wop was coined by Cape May's Mid-Atlantic Center for the Arts in the early 1990s to describe the unique, space-age architectural style, which is also referred to as the Googie or populuxe style.

The motels are very stylized, with Vegas-like neon signs, plastic palm trees, and fantastic architecture. Construction of condominia in the area has resulted in the demolition of many motels, but the Wildwood Doo Wop Preservation League has taken action to help save and restore the remaining historic buildings. The Caribbean Motel in Wildwood Crest, and the Chateau Bleu Motel in North Wildwood are both listed on the National Register of Historic Places.

A 1950s Doo Wop museum has recently been built which contains property from demolished motels such as neon signs and furniture. Neo-Doo Wop buildings in the area feature a neon-lit Wawa and a 1950s-style Acme Supermarket.

History
Motel construction in the Wildwoods began in the early 1950s.  1958 was a banner year for construction in Wildwood Crest, with the opening of the Satellite, Caribbean, El Reno (later the South Beach Motel), Sand Castle, Swan Motel and Tangiers motels. The Rio Motel, in Wildwood proper, also made its debut that spring. New motels were built into the 1970s.

Morey Brothers

Many of these Doo-Wop motels were designed by the brothers Lewis J. (Lou) and Wilburt C. (Will) Morey, born in West Wildwood in 1925 and 1927, respectively. In 1952, their company Morey Brothers Builders built Wildwood's first motel, the single-story Jay's Motel, at the corner of Hildreth and Atlantic Avenues. In 1955 they dissolved their formal business partnership and began to work more independently on motel designs.

Styles
Doo Wop motels generally include U-shaped or L-shaped designs of two or three stories, asymmetric elements, swimming pools, adjacent parking or second story sun decks over parking spaces, plastic palm trees, angular walls or windows, flat overhanging roofs, prominent neon signs and railing, bright colors, and a contemporary or fantasy theme.  References to popular culture or history were also common. The themes or sub-styles have been classified as: Modern/Blastoff, Vroom, Chinatown Revival, Tiki (Polynesian Pop), and Phony Colonee. The Blastoff style is reminiscent of the jet-age airports of the 1950s and 1960s. The Vroom style includes forward-thrusting building elements. Phony Colonee imitates the mass market Colonial Revival architecture of the 1950s and 1960s with Colonial American brick and lamppost elements

Neon signs
Each motel typically had one or more large, garish neon signs used to draw in passing motorists to their establishment. These signs became part of the architectural style and motels competed to have the most distinctive sign.  Two firms supplied most of the signs, Ace Sign Company and Allied Sign Company, with W. Robert Hentges becoming the best known local sign designer.  Hentges originally worked for Ace, then moved to Allied, and later founded his own company. Local laws banned flashing signs and limited revolving signs.

Existing motels

Caribbean Motel

The Caribbean Motel in Wildwood Crest, built in 1958 and now restored, was the first motel to use the full-size plastic palm trees that now adorn most of the Doo Wop motels in the area.  The motel was saved from demolition in 2004, when it was purchased by George Miller and Caroline Emigh, who succeeded in getting the property placed on the national historic registry. After reading the book, How to Doo Wop: the Wildwoods-by-the-Sea Handbook of Design Guidelines published by the Doo Wop Preservation League, they were so impressed by the suggested designs of Philadelphia architect Anthony Bracali that they hired him to oversee restoration of the motel. The interior design was done by Darleen Lev, a designer from New York City who was staying at the motel around the time that Miller and Emigh bought the property. An admirer of the Technicolor film process, Lev's designs are modeled on movie sets of the 1950s, as well as reflecting the motel's Caribbean motif. The Caribbean Motel was owned by the Rossi family for more than 30 years, until the early 1990s.

Chateau Bleu Motel

Located in North Wildwood, Chateau Bleu Motel was built in 1962 and added to the National Register of Historic Places on March 25, 2004. It features a heart shaped swimming pool.

Oceanview Motel
The Oceanview Motel in Wildwood Crest, which was built in 1964, is the largest motel ever built in The Wildwoods.  In 2009, the owners had plans to demolish the motel to make way for condominia, but it was rejected by the New Jersey Department of Environmental Protection.  The Oceanview was originally named the Admiral East Motel, when the Admiral West Motel (now the Admiral Resort Motel), shared the same owner.

Other motels
Notable existing motels also include: The Jolly Roger, The Pan American, The Crusader, The Waikiki, The Newport, The Sea Shell, The Admiral, The Adventurer, The VIP, The Carriage Stop, The Daytona, The Granada, The Tangiers, the Park Lane and the Yankee Clipper.

Extant historic motels

Demolished motels
From 2003 to 2006, over 50 motels had been demolished to make way for condominium development. In addition to the Ebb Tide, notable demolished motels in the area included the Satellite, Kona Kai, Waterways, Christine Motor Inn, Fantasy, Rio, and Sea Rose motels.

Ebb Tide Motel

The Ebb Tide Motel, built in 1957 and demolished in 2003, is credited as the first Doo-Wop motel in Wildwood Crest.

The Lampliter
Recently demolished and no word on what will replace it.

The Sea Rose Motel
The Sea Rose Motel, which was owned by Stanley and Catherine Stefankiewicz, was demolished in Fall 2004. The motel was owned for many years by the Stefankiewicz Family, who also owned the Poplar Cafe which is now known as "Goodnight Irenes".

Satellite Motel
Built in 1958, the Satellite Motel was one of the Wildwoods' signature "Doo Wop" landmarks until its demolition after the 2004 season, sparking a wave of redevelopment in the area that winter. It was located on the northeast corner of Atlantic & Aster in Wildwood Crest. The Satellite's rooftop neon sign was installed as part of the Neon Garden at the Doo Wop Experience museum in May 2008. The motel was featured prominently in Thomas Hine's 1986 book, Populuxe.

As the loss of the original Satellite was so great, plans are underway for a successor to it - the 21st Century Satellite Motel.  The new project looks back to the original Satellite's first decade of life – when it was arguably at its best and purest form aesthetically, and truest to its initial vision as an overall experience for its guests – for its inspiration, moving it forward into the future for its new form.

Sand Castle Motel
Recently torn down to make way for The Sandcastle Condominiums.

See also

Cape May Historic District
MiMo District
List of Googie architecture structures (United States)

References

Historic districts in New Jersey
Googie architecture
Moderne architecture in New Jersey
The Wildwoods, New Jersey
Modernist heritage districts
Motels in the United States
Tourist attractions in Cape May County, New Jersey